Anton Anatolyevich Lunin (born 15 September 1986) is a former Russian professional football player.

Club career
He played two seasons in the Russian Football National League for FC Kuban Krasnodar and FC Torpedo Vladimir.

External links
 
 

1986 births
Living people
Russian footballers
Association football midfielders
FC Dynamo Bryansk players
FC Kuban Krasnodar players
FC Oryol players
FC Baltika Kaliningrad players
FC Torpedo Vladimir players